Painted frog  may refer to:

Atelopus ebenoides – from Central America
Discoglossus pictus – from the central Mediterranean region.
Neobatrachus pictus – from southern Australia
Neobatrachus sudelli – from eastern Australia
Discoglossus nigriventer
Kaloula pulchra
Discoglossus pictus – from Africa

Animal common name disambiguation pages